Anse is a commune in the Rhône department in eastern France. It is situated on the river Saône, approx. 7 km south of Villefranche-sur-Saône (near Lyon).

Councils of Anse
Several medieval councils were held in this French town.

That of 994 decreed, among other disciplinary measures, abstinence from servile labour after three o'clock (None) on Saturday, i.e. the observance of the vigil of Sunday.

The council of 1025 was held for the purpose of settling a conflict between the monks of Cluny Abbey and the Bishop of Mâcon, who complained that, though their monastery was situated in his diocese, the monks had obtained ordination from the Archbishop of Vienne. St. Odilon of Cluny was present and exhibited a papal privilege exempting his monastery from the episcopal jurisdiction of Mâcon. But the fathers of the council caused to be read the ancient canons ordaining that in every country the abbots and monks should be subject to their own bishop, and declared null a privilege contrary to the canons. The Archbishop of Vienne was required to apologize to the Bishop of Mâcon.

In 1076 a council was held for the purpose of furthering the ecclesiastical reforms of St. Gregory VII.

At the council of 1100, Hugues, Archbishop of Lyon, demanded from the assembled fathers, among whom was St. Anselm of Canterbury, a subsidy for the expenses of the journey that, with the Pope's permission, he was about to make to Jerusalem.

Population

People
 John Claudius Neraz, (1828–1894), born in Anse, Roman Catholic priest, bishop of San Antonio, Texas.

See also
 Chemin de fer Touristique d'Anse
 Communes of the Rhône department

References
 

Communes of Rhône (department)
Segusiavi
Lyonnais